The 2005–06 A1 Grand Prix of Nations, China was an A1 Grand Prix race, held on the weekend of April 2, 2006 at Shanghai International Circuit.

Report

Qualifying
A1 Team Malaysia snatched their first pole position for the final Sprint race of the 2005/06 A1 Grand Prix season this afternoon after the flag had dropped in the last of the four qualifying sessions. A1 Team Great Britain’s Darren Manning, who led from the word go, was denied the opportunity to head up the grid in his first A1GP race by Malaysia’s Alex Yoong. While Manning still recorded the fastest lap of qualifying (1.51.832), Yoong pushed his aggregate time ahead of A1 Team France and Great Britain, with a 1.51.846 flying lap after leaving the pits in the last few minutes of the session.

With three official practice sessions and four 15 minute qualifying sessions completed over two days, not a single red flag was seen all weekend. There were a few spins including a matching pair from A1 Team Australia and USA on turn one in the first qualifying session and another from A1 Team New Zealand in Q3, but they each managed to get themselves back on track for the subsequent sessions.

Home racers A1 Team China and series leaders A1 Team France are both taking advantage of a rule which allows teams to change drivers between qualifying and each of the two races. A1 Team China will run with Ma Qinghua in the sprint race and Tengyi Jiang in the feature race while A1 Team France will run Alexandre Premat for the sprint and Nicolas Lapierre for the feature race. All other A1 Teams will keep their qualifying driver behind the wheel for both races.

Sprint race
A1 Team Malaysia's Alex Yoong converted his first pole position into the team's first race win after a dominant performance in the sprint race at the A1 Grand Prix of Nations, Shanghai International Circuit, China, taking his spot at the head of the grid for the following feature race.

Series leaders, France put pressure on from the start, trying everything possible to pass Great Britain and Malaysia ahead of them. From the approach to turn one, Alexandre Premat slipped the tricolour car between Malaysia and Britain trying to edge ahead through turns one and two but the grid leaders held their positions and France fell back to its third place starting position out of turn three. It was the start of an unusually bad race for the French who may have laid claim to the Series title but were still under attack from the rest of the field throughout the race.

As the field crossed the start/finish line into the second lap, Malaysia was building its lead on Great Britain, with Mexico shortly behind having overtaken France at the end of the first lap. Italy brought up the rear after an earlier spin and continued to battle with China whose second driver, Ma Qinghua defended well in front of his home crowd. A collision between Switzerland and Canada saw retirements from both, while A1 Team Austria at seventeenth across the line, completed the 100,000th race mile for the A1 engine, demonstrating its reliability having nearly completed the first season without a single engine failure.

While an incident between Lebanon and Austria saw both teams retire from the rear of the field, the major battles continued at the front. A1 Team Ireland's number two, Michael Devaney, racing for only the second time this season, used his last PowerBoost on the approach to turn one stealing fourth place from France on lap five.

Just one lap later and France was once again the victim of an overtaking move, this time by the Netherlands' Jos Verstappen, who also cleared a path for Indonesia to follow through. Determined to maintain his position, France's Alexandre Premat defended hard but the Czech Republic with Tomáš Enge behind the wheel fought its way past a few laps later.

While France and the Czech Republic contested sixth place, Indonesia kept the pressure on the Netherlands ahead of them for fifth. Verstappen's vast race experience did not make the defence of his position an easy task and the dogged determination of Ananda Mikola eventually paid off. As technical problems brought an early end to the Dutch race, Indonesia was the first to head past before the orange car of Verstappen slowed on the track eventually pulling into the pits at the end of lap 11.

As the grid headed into lap 12, the battle focused on second and third place Great Britain and Mexico as Salvador Durán intensified the pressure on newcomer Darren Manning. Manning held his nerve to the flag, holding off double winner at the previous race in Mazda Raceway Laguna Seca to take second place with Durán less than a second behind.

Winning his first race in A1 Grand Prix, Malaysia's Alex Yoong said: "The car was good, we knew the temperature was rising, and were worried about the condition of the tyres. Fortunately after the start I was able to conserve the tyres and still able to push at the end".

Commenting on the trend of drivers winning the Sprint and Feature races, Alex said "I really like that trend! Hopefully I will be able to repeat it. But it will be very competitive in the main race. The pit stops will be crucial and it will be really important to look after the car."

Finishing second in his first race in A1 Grand Prix, Darren Manning was pleased to secure A1 Team Great Britain's third place in the standings. "This was obviously the main goal for the team, and it has been a great weekend. I think I have acclimatised myself now. I didn't have the pace of Alex in the race, but I managed to fend off France and the charging Salvador. I'm not really used to this two race thing! The second race will be more like I'm used to, a long race with strategy and pit stops, so I think past experience will help me."

Salvador Durán battled hard to pass Darren Manning, right up to the last lap. "It was really difficult to pass, we were managing to do similar times, but we had different set ups on the cars, so we were faster on different parts of the track. I did try really hard one time to get past, but when that didn't work, I knew I was done, as I had no more PowerBoosts left. Hopefully the next race will be different."

Main race
The Czech Republic became the eighth nation to win an A1 Grand Prix event, crossing the line first at the end of the Shanghai Feature race. Snatching first place from Sprint race winner, Malaysia's Alex Yoong who still managed to retain second ahead of Australia's Ryan Briscoe who had his first podium finish of the season, the third for the team.

All 22 cars made a clean start to this afternoon's Feature race going straight into battle for vital points in the last race of the season. Having taken advantage of A1 Grand Prix's unique driver rules, A1 Team France, this time with Nicolas Lapierre behind the wheel, made the best gain rising from seventh to fourth putting them back into contention for a final podium finish.

A bad start for A1 Team Ireland was made even worse before the first lap was over. After a strong and determined performance in the Sprint race the luck of the Irish ran out as they came wheel to wheel with Indonesia on turn seven. The green car flipped over the Indonesia, spinning several times before coming to a halt upside down in the gravel trap.

As the safety car came out, every team took the chance to make their compulsory pit stop and as the entire field filed in, the pressure turned to the race crews as they worked to get their car out ahead of its rivals. An excellent stop for Malaysia saw the bright yellow car pull out as other cars continued to head and smooth stops for Switzerland and Canada saw them move up from the back of the grid to ninth and tenth respectively.

The safety car came in at the end of lap four and racing resumed with Malaysia leading the Czech Republic, Great Britain, Mexico, Australia, USA, New Zealand and Pakistan. But this order did not remain for long as the Czech Republic was quick to pounce on Malaysia making its move around the outside of turn one while Great Britain fell victim to Mexico and Australia.

On lap six Great Britain suffered again, being the first to take a drive through penalty also given to Mexico and the USA for a false start. The penalty cost Great Britain a points position but having grabbed nine points in the Sprint race, their third place in the Series was confirmed. When all three teams had taken their penalties, the leading pack looked considerably different with the Czech Republic ahead of Malaysia, Australia, New Zealand, Pakistan, Canada, Italy and Lebanon.

A1 Team France, slowed by a 1.54 minute pit stop which saw them drop to eighteenth at the end of the safety car session then began its climb up the field to an eventual sixth-place finish, which they took on the penultimate lap by overtaking Canada at the end of the 1.1 km straight. After taking Austria on lap six, Mexico, Switzerland, Portugal, Germany and China all fell victim over the next two laps.

For Lebanon a point in this race would have meant a lot and they fought to the finish to try to achieve this. On lap 17, it was Mexico that slipped by to take ninth but after then it was on lap 23 that the team finally saw their hopes dashed when A1 Team USA snatched tenth, the last points paying position.

Mexico made their final leap up the leader board into eighth by overtaking Italy on lap 25. For Italy, this was not the end of the affair but their driver's hope of taking the place back again were dashed due to a spin of lap 26. Meanwhile, Portugal and Austria were disputing twelfth place. Even though they were both out of the points, this battle continued right to the chequered flag with newcomer to the Series César Campaniço finishing in front.

Race winner, A1 Team Czech Republic's Tomáš Enge commented: "It's great to get this result today. We've had a lot of bad luck during the last half of the season. We've had lots of ups and downs in the last few races, in Mazda Raceway Laguna Seca we didn't finish either race. I hoped everything would go well, and in the end the pit stop and the restarts were all really good. I must thank the team for all their work and a great car. I think it will take us about a week to realise what has happened today. I'm very proud that the Czech Republic won the last race in the first season of A1 Grand Prix."

A1 Team Malaysia jumped from 10th in the Series standings to fifth after Alex Yoong's performance in Shanghai. "Before the weekend, we almost joked that we could get fourth in the series, if we won both races, and it nearly happened. The car was really good in the first race, in the second the balance wasn't quite as good, and Tomas was doing a good job. But we are pleased with this second place."

Ryan Briscoe for A1 Team Australia said: "It's a fantastic result to come away with third, especially as this is only my second outing in A1 Grand Prix. It means a lot to be racing for your country. I must say a big thank you to all the boys in the team. I kept working hard, and tried to preserve the tyres as much as possible, but I didn't have the speed to catch Alex. During the first race, we had a slight problem with the set up, but we made a few changes before the second race, and found the best set up again."

Asked whether Formula One was better than A1 Grand Prix, Alex Yoong answered, "You cannot compare F1 and A1GP, they are completely different. Formula One is the pinnacle of motorsport in terms of technology. It is about manufacturer against manufacturer, about engine deals and about money. A1GP is run by countries, the cars are identical, it is an equal playing field. The aim is to see which is the best team and driver, it is about the people. I would definitely stay in A1GP, it would have to be a good deal for me to move to F1. A very good deal!"

The bonus point for the fastest race lap of the day went to A1 Team Malaysia who recorded a time of 1.52.508 on lap 14 of the Sprint race, with a speed of 174.4 km/h.

The A1 Grand Prix of Nations, Shanghai International Circuit, China was the last race in A1 Grand Prix's inaugural season. The first race of the second season will take place at Circuit Park Zandvoort, Netherlands on 29 September - 1 October 2006

Results

Sprint Race Results
The Sprint Race took place on Sunday, April 2, 2006.

Total Points
Total points awarded:

China
A1 Grand Prix